The Colombian Open 2015 is the men's edition of the 2015 Colombian Open, which is a tournament of the PSA World Tour event International (Prize money : 50 000 $). The event took place in Bogota in Colombia from 5 to 8 August. Alfredo Ávila won his first Colombian Open trophy, beating Saurav Ghosal in the final.

Prize money and ranking points
For 2015, the prize purse was $50,000. The prize money and points breakdown is as follows:

Seeds

Draw and results

See also
PSA World Tour 2015
Colombian Open

References

External links
PSA Colombian Open 2015 website
Abierto Colombiano De Squash 2015 official website

Colombian Open (squash)
Colombian Open
2015 in Colombian sport